David Lyme (born Jordi Cubino Bermejo, 22 November 1966, Spain), also known as Jordi Cubino, is a Spanish singer, songwriter, and model. He is one of the pillars of the so-called "Sabadell sound" (named after the Spanish city of Sabadell), a variant of the Italo disco made in Spain, which became popular in Europe in the 1980s. 
Originally, he started out singing opera, but later discovered Italo disco by "accident".

In 1985, he released his first single "Bambina", under Max Music and it became so successful that he soon released two more singles ("Let's Go to Sitges" and "Playboy"), followed by the release of his debut album, Like a Star. The album contains eight songs including two ballads, a new version of "Bambina", as well as the hit singles "Bye Bye Mi Amor" and "I Don't Wanna Lose You". Those singles were popular in various countries across Europe, but most popular in Japan and the Philippines.

In 1988, he released his second album, Lady, which included the singles "Never Say You Love Me" and "Lady". His singles are included in the compilation series Max Mix, including Max Mix 2 ("Let's Go to Sitges"), Max Mix 3 ("Bambina"), Max Mix 4 ("Playboy"), Max Mix 5 ("Bye Bye Mi Amor" and "I Don't Wanna Lose You"), and Max Mix 6 ("Never Say You Love Me").

In 1990, Lyme left Max Music and joined the label Blanco Y Negro (a competitor at the time for Max Music). He then released the single "Perestroika". However, it was less successful than his previous singles. This led to the end of Lyme's singing career.

Despite the collapse of his singing career, he now owns a recording studio. He produces and writes music for other artists. He also writes songs for TV commercials for companies such as Coca-Cola and Chupa Chups. A compilation of his singles was released by Sony Music in 2004.

Discography

Albums
Like a Star (1986)
Lady (1988)

Singles
"Bambina" (1985)
"Let's Go to Sitges" (1985)
"Playboy" (1986)
"I Don't Wanna Lose You" (1986)
"Bye Bye Mi Amor" (1987)
"Never Say You Love Me" (1988)
"Lady" (1988)
"Perestroika" (1990)

References

Official website
Biography

1966 births
Living people
Spanish male singers
Eurodisco musicians
Spanish Italo disco musicians